Jake Flores is an American stand-up comedian and podcaster from Texas now living in New York City. He has released two albums on Stand Up! Records: 2014's Humours, and 2021's Bad Omen.

Flores was born in San Antonio, Texas, and grew up in Houston. His father, a chemist, is Mexican-American; his mother, who is white, is originally from the Midwest.

Career

Stand-up comedy
Flores began performing comedy in Austin, Texas, when he was 19, after dropping out of the University of Texas at Austin. In 2007, he performed in the finals of NBC's Stand Up For Diversity contest. He moved to Brooklyn, New York, at age 27.

Flores identifies himself as politically left. Flores received attention following his jokes about  killing ICE agents that led to an investigation by Homeland Security. The incident was written about in publications including Reason and The New York Post, and Flores was interviewed about it on several podcasts including Chapo Trap House.  He also discusses the incident on his album Bad Omen. Flores claims to take inspiration from punk music; Flores has also called himself a "big fan" of Lenny Bruce, explaining to one interviewer that "like him, I also had a run in with the state over comedy, and am a leftist." 

He has performed across the U.S., and at festivals including Austin's Fun Fun Fun Fest, SXSW, The Fest in Gainesville, Florida, Moontower Comedy Festival, New Orleans' Hell Yes Fest, the touring road show of Comedy Central's Roast Battle, and at events for the anti-capitalist streaming service Means TV.

He has written for The New York Observer, Cracked, and the New York Times, and has contributed to Vice .

Albums
He has released two albums on Stand Up! Records: 2014's Humours, and 2021's Bad Omen.Both albums were met with mixed reviews."

Podcasts
Flores has been involved in several podcasts, and hosts one of his own.  In 2017, he started Pod Damn America, a podcast he hosts with other comedians. 

In 2019, he and anthropologist and comedy booker Luisa Díez started “Why You Mad?” .

He also hosted Mr. Cleo, a comedy podcast about a telephone-psychic scam artist, for 25 episodes in 2017–18.

Discography
Jake Flores, Humours (Stand Up! Records, 2014)
Jake Flores, Bad Omen (Stand Up! Records, 2021)

References

External links
Official Jake Flores website
Jake Flores at Stand Up! Records website

Living people
1980s births
Year of birth uncertain
American democratic socialists
American stand-up comedians
Comedians from Texas
Comedians from New York City
People from San Antonio
People from Houston
People from Austin, Texas
American male comedians
21st-century American comedians
Stand Up! Records artists
American podcasters
American anti-capitalists